Songming County is a county under the jurisdiction of Kunming, the capital of Yunnan province, China. It is famous for the Yanglin Fat Liquor and the Dian Opera.

Administrative divisions
Songming County is divided into two subdistricts and three towns.

Subdistricts  Songyang, Yangqiao
Towns  Xiaojie, Yanglin, Niulanjiang

Transport 
China National Highway 213

Economy of Songming County 
 Songming Yanglin Industrial Development Zone

Climate

References 

 Area Code and Postal Code in Yunnan Province

External links 
Songming County Official Website
Information about Songming County

County-level divisions of Kunming